Konstantin Steinhübel (born 5 January 1990) is a German rower. He won the silver medal in the lightweight quadruple sculls at the 2014 World Rowing Championships.

References 
 

1990 births
Living people
German male rowers

World Rowing Championships medalists for Germany